Jaromír Šilhan (born 10 April 1983) is a professional Czech football player who currently plays for FK Baník Sokolov. He has made more than 50 appearances in the Gambrinus liga for Kladno.

References

External links
 Profile at FKSokolov.cz

Czech footballers
1983 births
Living people
Czech First League players
SK Kladno players
FK Baník Sokolov players

Association football forwards